Nayagram Pandit Raghunath Murmu Government College, established in 2014,. is the government degree college in Jhargram district. It offers undergraduate courses in arts. It is affiliated to Vidyasagar University.

Departments

Arts

Bengali
English
History
Philosophy
Sanskrit
Political Science
Santali
Sociology

See also

References

External links
http://nayagramprmgovtcollege.ac.in/

Colleges affiliated to Vidyasagar University
Educational institutions established in 2014
Universities and colleges in Jhargram district
2014 establishments in West Bengal